Songyang Catholic Church is a Roman Catholic Church located in Xiping Subdistrict, Songyang County, Zhejiang, China.

History
Songyang Catholic Church was built in the Guangxu period (1875–1908) of the Qing dynasty (1644–1911). It is the only well-preserved Catholic Church in Lishui city.

Architecture
Now the existing main buildings include the Church, the Priest Building and living buildings.

References

Further reading
 
 

Churches in Zhejiang
Tourist attractions in Lishui
Roman Catholic churches in China